Sky Gardens Nine Elms is a residential and retail tower in Nine Elms, within the borough of Lambeth, London. The scheme has been designed by architects Careyjones Chapmantolcher (CJCT) and developed by Fraser Property Development UK. Its construction was part of a wider regeneration of the Nine Elms area of London.

Background and design 

Fraser Property Development UK proposed plans for Sky Gardens in 2008, designed by Amin Taha Architects and Careyjones Chapmantolcher. These plans included a tower of ) using only glass cladding. However, in 2010, revised plans were proposed, designed solely by Careyjones Chapmantolcher.

The building would not be clad entirely from glass, and retail space would form part of the scheme, with a low rise element adding affordable housing.

The name given to the development is taken from the 2,500 sq m gardens on its top floor. The gardens include an area for residents to grow a weekly salad box each for nine months of year.

In 2014, Sky Gardens won 'Best Housing Project' at the Sunday Times British Homes Awards.

Construction 
Construction began in 2014 after construction company Mace were awarded the contract to build the development. The building topped out in 2016. Construction was completed in April 2017.

Location 
Sky Gardens is located on the corner of Wyvil Road and Wandsworth Road. The nearest station is Vauxhall.

See also 
List of tallest buildings and structures in London
List of tallest buildings in the United Kingdom

References

External links 
 Careyjones Chapmantolcher website cjctstudios.com
 Official Nine Elms regeneration website nineelmslondon.com

Skyscrapers in the London Borough of Lambeth
Proposed skyscrapers in London
Nine Elms